Karawal Nagar (earlier known as Qarawal Nagar) legislative assembly constituency is a Vidhan Sabha constituency in Delhi. It is a part of the North East Delhi Lok Sabha constituency. Densely populated with the people of every corner of India, most of the people belongs to Bihar, Punjab, & Haryana.

Members of Legislative Assembly
Key

Election results

2020

2015

2013

2008

2003

1998

1993

References

Assembly constituencies of Delhi
Delhi Legislative Assembly